Maršiči is a small village in the Municipality of Ribnica in southern Slovenia. The area is part of the traditional region of Lower Carniola and is now included in the Southeast Slovenia Statistical Region.

Name
The name Maršiči is a collective toponym, referring to a settlement where several people with the surname Maršič lived.

Church
The local church, built on the southeastern edge of the settlement, is dedicated to Saint Ulrich and belongs to the Parish of Sveti Gregor. It dates to the 16th century.

References

External links
Maršiči on Geopedia

Populated places in the Municipality of Ribnica